Tsukioka Station may refer to the following train stations in Japan:

 Tsukioka Station (Niigata) (月岡駅), in Niigata Prefecture
 Tsukioka Station (Toyama) (月岡駅), in Toyama Prefecture